Jean Dika Dika (born 4 June 1979) is a Cameroonian footballer. He played in five matches for the Cameroon national football team in 2001 and 2002. He was also named in Cameroon's squad for the 2002 African Cup of Nations tournament.

References

External links
 

1979 births
Living people
Cameroonian footballers
Cameroon international footballers
Atlético Madrid B players
Getafe CF footballers
C.F. União de Lamas players
LASK players
F.C. Ashdod players
2002 African Cup of Nations players
Segunda División players
Liga Portugal 2 players
Austrian Football Bundesliga players
Israeli Premier League players
Cameroonian expatriate footballers
Expatriate footballers in Spain
Expatriate footballers in Portugal
Expatriate footballers in Israel
Cameroonian expatriate sportspeople in Spain
Cameroonian expatriate sportspeople in Portugal
Cameroonian expatriate sportspeople in Israel
Association football defenders